Maickelpatti is a village in the Budalur block of Thanjavur district, Tamil Nadu, India.

References

Villages in Thanjavur district